Xanthoparmelia perezdepazii is a species of saxicolous (rock-dwelling), foliose lichen in the family Parmeliaceae. It is found in the Canary Islands.

Taxonomy
The lichen was formally described as a new species in 2007 by Israel Pérez-Vargas, Consuelo Hernández-Padron, and John Alan Elix. The species epithet honours Professor , "in recognition of his many contributions to Canarian lichenology".

Description
Soredia are absent, but there is a dense covering of isidia on the thallus surface; these structures are initially spherical, later becoming cylindrical, and measuring up to 1 mm high. The medulla is white, while the lower thallus surface is mid- to dark-brown, but not blackened (as is typical with many other Xanthoparmelia species). Rhizines are simples (i.e., unbranched), more or less the same colour as the undersurface, and measure up to 1 mm long. Neither apothecia nor pycnidia were present in the type collection. The lichen products present in X. perezdepazii are usnic acid, constipatic acid, and protoconstipatic acid.

Habitat and distribution
Xanthoparmelia perezdepazii is only known to occur in the Canary Islands. Its habitat is the shrub-like community known as "retamar", found at high elevations, and featuring Spartocytisus supranubius, Pterocephalus lasiospermus, and Pinus canariensis. The lichen tends to be better developed in northeast-facing locations, where typical associating lichens include Lecanora rupicola, Rhizoplaca melanophthalma, Physcia albinea, Xanthoparmelia tinctina, and crustose species from the genera Aspicilia and Caloplaca.

See also
List of Xanthoparmelia species

References

perezdepazii
Lichen species
Lichens described in 2007
Lichens of Macaronesia
Taxa named by John Alan Elix